The pyxis made in 968 CE/357AH for Prince al-Mughira (15 cm x 8 cm) is a portable ivory carved container that dates from Medieval Islam's Spanish Umayyad period. It is in the collection of the Louvre in Paris. The container was made in one of the Madinat al-Zahra workshops, near modern-day Cordoba, Spain and is thought to have been a coming-of-age present for the son of caliph 'Abd al-Rahman III. Historical sources say that the prince referred to as al-Mughira was Abu al-Mutarrif al-Mughira, the last born son of the caliph ‘Abd al-Rahman III, born to a concubine named Mushtaq.  We are certain this pyxis belongs to al-Mughira because of the inscription around the base of the lid which reads: “Blessing from God, goodwill, happiness and prosperity to al-Mughīra, son of the Commander of the Faithful, may God's mercy [be upon him], made in the year 357"

Physicality and Context
Pixides are known as luxury personal vessels given to members of the royal family and are thought to have been used for holding precious gems, jewelry, aromas, perfume etc.; however, the actual purpose of the pyxis of al-Mughira is unknown because there are no traces of any substance on the interior. Though the entire surface of the pyxis is intricately and expertly carved with different forms of decoration, most attention lies within the four main medallions around its diameter.

The exterior of the pyxis is elaborately carved and incised elephant ivory, imported by the caliph from North Africa. It is possible the pyxis was originally inlaid with gold and silver but only traces of jade remain. Though discovered with metal hinges mounting the lid on the container, it is believed (and clear) that the mounts were placed later than the original creation date because no space was allowed for the metal mounts to be placed. This is known because the hinges destroy part of the inscription.  Due to these mentioned uncertainties, it is unclear how the lid was intended to be situated on the vessel and thus unknown how the inscription should be read, what is considered front or back and what its relation is to the scenes below.

The Medallions
Medallion One displays a scene of two men gathering eggs from falcon nests, which is popularly seen as a symbol for Umayyad power or legitimacy. Scholars have claimed that the synchronism between the falcon and Umayyad power was a current and strong symbol due to such metaphors found in poetry and art during that time period. In particular, ‘Abd al-Rahman I al-Dakhil, founder of the Umayyads in al-Andalus, was famously named “the falcon of the Quraysh” by an Abbasid caliph.
Because both men are being bitten by dogs it is also suggested that this was an implication of threat to those who would try to grasp power.

Medallion Two is of two horse riders picking clusters of dates from a date-palm tree. These trees are primarily found in the Middle East and North Africa and may allude to the Eastern lands, or “homeland of the palm tree groves”, lost to the Abbasids—the dynasty that established Baghdad and overthrew the Syrian Umayyads.  Abd al-Rahman I, who founded Umayyad rule in the Iberian Peninsula, used the tree as code in his poetry. Some scholars suggest that the intertwining branches of the tree represent the twin branches of the Umayyad dynasty of which “both prophecy and the caliphate sprang” according to Umayyad panegyrist Hasan al-Tubni.

Medallion Three shows a musical court scene of two seated figures flanking a middle figure who is suspected to be a servant due to his smaller, secondary scale. One figure holds the braided specter and flask of the Umayyads, while the other holds a fan. The meaning of this medallion is quite controversial but a popular viewpoint argues that the man with the specter and flask symbolizes the Umayyad Caliph and the figure with the fan symbolizes the Abbasids. It is argued by Francisco Prado-Vilar that this scene could represent a ceremony performed in the court of al-Hakam II that would be of political significance to al-Mughira and act as a reminder to him of the continuation and solidity of the dynasty.

Medallion Four is the only medallion that shows a common symbol of power through an image of a bull and lion fighting. Some scholars, including those at the Louvre and Eva Baer, have interpreted this as a message of authority and legitimacy of Umayyad Caliphs in competition with the Abbasid Caliphs, who ruled in Baghdad. Prado-Vilar ties this scene to fables told at the time that were used to teach life lessons to the young, especially to family of the royal court. He makes the claim that, with keeping Kalila wa Dimna in mind, al-Mughira would reflect on the symbolism of the “tragic consequences of listening to evil advice of those plotting to have him conspire against his brother’s lineage;” a way for the caliph to keep him in his secondary role and to not attempt to seek reign.

Interpretation Controversy

Scholars like Renata Holod argue that the pyxis was a present given to al-Mughira with an ironic, comical edge as a reminder to him that he would never be the next in line for rule. Holod also suspects the gift was not from the caliph or commissioned by al-Mughira; however, scholars like Makariou who refute this claim argue that it would be difficult for someone other than royalty to commission such a highly expensive item and to solely focus to a purely ironic message does not lead anywhere.  Makariou’s arguments also conflict with Prado-Vilar, who focuses solely on the pyxis as a vessel of serious warning to al-Mughira in regards to any political goals he may have had; however, Makariou contends that this argument shows lack of knowledge in regards to medieval caliphate customs and that it was not in the nature of the caliph to be so seriously concerned with internal power struggles.

The actual purpose of the pyxis of al-Mughira is highly argued and unanimously unknown. We do know the caliphate of Cordoba was infamous for their ability to acquire highly expensive and luxurious materials for their royal court. And because of their power, capabilities and secrecy, they maintained a singular and exclusive relationship with Northern Africa; a trading agreement no other dynasty was able to access. Ivory, a valuable and hard to work with material, was one of the many ways they displayed their wealth and power; however, using these capabilities to create the pyxis of al-Mughira is widely seen as wasteful and mediocre because of its leisurely context indicated by the assortment of princely entertainments on its exterior; however it is a vessel of impeccable craftsmanship and expert design. To date the pyxis of al-Mughira’s purpose is still speculated and debated. It is currently a part of the Islamic Art collection at the Louvre in Paris.

See also
Pyxis of Zamora
Leyre Casket

Notes

References

Baer, Eva. The Human Figure in Islamic Art: Inheritances and Islamic Transformations. Costa Mesa: Mazda Publishers, 2004.
Borrut, Antoine, Paul M. Cobb and Sophie Makariou. Umayyad Legacies: Medieval Memories from Syria to Spain. Boston: Brill, 2010.
Dusinberre, Deke and Gilles Plazy. Paris: History, Architecture, Art, Lifestyle, in Detail. Paris: Flammarion, 2003.
Dodds, Jerrilynn. The Art of Medieval Spain, A.D. 500-1200. New York: Metropolitan Museum of Art, 1993.
Fayard, Judy. "Under the Magic Carpet: The Splendor of the Louvre's Department of Islamic Art." Wall Street Journal Online, (Sep 27, 2012), accessed February 10, 2012, https://www.wsj.com/articles/SB10000872396390444180004578018403267097568.
Makariou, Sophie. "The al-Mughīra Pyxis and Spanish Umayyad Ivories: Aims and Tools of Power" In Borrut, Antoine and Cobb, Paul M. (eds.) "Umayyad Legacies: Medieval Memories from Syria to Spain", Brill, 2010. pp. 313–335
Rosser-Owen, Mirriam. “The Metal Mounts on Andalusi Ivories: Initial Observations.” In Metalwork and Material Culture in the Islamic World: Art, Craft and Text, edited by Venetia Porter and Mariam Rosser-Owen, 301-316. London: I.B.Tauris, 2012.
Prado-Vilar, Francisco. “Enclosed in Ivory: The Miseducation of al-Mughira.” Journal of the David Collection, no. 2 (2005): 138-163.

Arabic art
Ivory works of art
Islamic art of Spain
10th-century sculptures
968
10th century in Al-Andalus
Islamic art of the Louvre